Khaptad Baba, also known as Swami Sachchidananda, was a spiritual saint who traveled along the high mountainous regions of Nepal and settled temporarily in Ilam, Kalinchowk, Swargadwari, Mushikot, Chandannath and ultimately in the Khaptad Valley in the 1940s to meditate and worship.
He lived for more than fifty years in the valley, and overlooked the establishment of Khaptad National Park in 1984. He is revered as a Hindu saint. Within the national park, a hermitage, temples, and stone statues remain.

References

Hindu saints
1996 deaths
Nepalese writers